Linnea Andrea "Lenny" Quiñones Sandland (born 17 July 1980) is an American-born Mexican former footballer who played as a goalkeeper. She has been a member of the Mexico women's national team.

International career
Quiñones played for Mexico at senior level in the 1999 FIFA Women's World Cup.

Notes

References

External links

1980 births
Living people
Women's association football goalkeepers
Citizens of Mexico through descent
Mexican women's footballers
Mexico women's international footballers
1999 FIFA Women's World Cup players
American women's soccer players
Soccer players from San Diego
American sportspeople of Mexican descent
San Diego State Aztecs women's soccer players